Asad Afridi (born 30 December 1992) is a Pakistani cricketer. He made his first-class debut for Abbottabad in the 2013–14 Quaid-e-Azam Trophy on 16 January 2014.

He was the leading run-scorer for Federally Administered Tribal Areas in the 2018–19 Quaid-e-Azam Trophy, with 437 runs in five matches. In March 2019, he was named in Federal Areas' squad for the 2019 Pakistan Cup.

References

External links
 

1992 births
Living people
Pakistani cricketers
Place of birth missing (living people)
Abbottabad cricketers
Federally Administered Tribal Areas cricketers